The Windtech Quarx is a Spanish single-place paraglider that was designed and produced by Windtech Parapentes of Gijón. It is now out of production.

Design and development
The aircraft was designed as an advanced intermediate glider and was produced in two generations, the Quarx1 and Quarx2. The models are each named for their approximate wing area in square metres.

The design was optimized for a wide speed range and was marketed to pilots "from the weekend recreational flyer to the competition pilot".

The glider wing is made from Porcher Marine Skytex 44 g/m2 nylon fabric. The rib reinforcements are 310 g/m2 Dacron, with the trailing edge reinforcement fabricated of 175 g/m2 polyester. The lines are all sheathed Kevlar and 1.1 and 1.7 mm in diameter or, optionally, 0.6 and 0.9 mm micro unsheathed lines. The risers are made from 20 mm wide Polyamida strapping.

Reviewer Noel Bertrand noted in a 2003 review that the Quarx2 had been "very successful".

Variants

Quarx1
Quarx1 23
Extra small-sized model for lighter pilots. The glider model is AFNOR Performance certified.
Quarx1 25
Small-sized model for lightweight pilots. The glider model is Deutscher Hängegleiterverband e.V. (DHV) 2 and AFNOR Performance certified.
Quarx1 27
Medium-sized model for mid-weight pilots. The glider model is DHV 2 and AFNOR Performance certified.
Quarx1 29
Large-sized model for heavier pilots. The glider model is DHV 2 and AFNOR Performance certified.
Quarx1 31
Extra large-sized model for much heavier pilots. The glider model is not certified.

Quarx2
Quarx2 23
Extra small-sized model for lighter pilots. The glider model is not certified.
Quarx2 25
Small-sized model for lightweight pilots. The glider model is AFNOR Standard certified.
Quarx2 27
Medium-sized model for mid-weight pilots. The glider model is AFNOR Standard certified.
Quarx2 29
Large-sized model for heavier pilots. The glider model is DHV 2 certified.

Specifications (Quarx2 25)

References

External links
 - Quarx1
 - Quarx2

Quarx
Paragliders